Delfi may refer to

 Delfi (web portal), internet portal in Estonia, Latvia, and Lithuania 
 Delfi (chess), chess engine
 Delfi bookstores, a chain of bookstores in Serbia
 Delfi Limited, a Singaporean confectionery company

See also
 Delphi (disambiguation)
 Delfi-C3
 Delfi-n3Xt
 Delfi AS v. Estonia, a 2015 European Court of Human Rights case